The Alliance for the Democratisation of the Army (in Dutch: Verbond tot Democratisering der Weermacht, VDW) was a Dutch political party representing military interests. The VDW played only a marginal role in Dutch politics.

Party History
The VDW was founded as a political arm of the officers' union Ons Belang (Our Interest). The 1918 elections were the first election in the Netherlands which used a system of proportional representation. With only 7000 votes (0.5% of the votes) the VDW one seat, as did several other one or two person parties. After the elections the election law became more restrictive. Between 1918 and 1921 the VDW cooperated in the neutral parliamentary party, with other four one or two seat parties, namely the Peasants' League, the Economic League, the Middle Class Party and the Neutral Party. The parliamentary party was led by former minister Willem Treub. The alliance ended in 1921 when the Economic League, the Middle Class Party and the Neutral Party all merged into the Liberal State Party, together with two larger liberal parties. The VDW did not take part in the 1922 election.

Ideology & Issues
The VDW was a typical special interest party. Its main goal was to represent the interests of officers and petty officers. It favoured the implementation of a conscripted army in which men would serve as soldiers and women as nurses. It wanted schools to teach more physical education and youth to do more sports and shooting exercises. It advocated free education and free healthcare for students. It wanted a stronger army and fleet. It favoured a more democratic army, with a stronger role for military unions, better salaries and pensions for officers.

Leadership & Support
This table show the VDW's results in elections to the House of Representatives and Senate, as well as the party's political leadership: the fractievoorzitter, is the chair of the parliamentary party and the lijsttrekker is the party's top candidate in the general election, these posts are normally taken by the party's leader.

Electorate
The party drew most its support from officers, under officer and petty officers.

Defunct political parties in the Netherlands